Joseph Glynn may refer to:
 Joseph Glynn (politician)
 Joseph Glynn (engineer)